The Battle of Doliana occurred on 30 May 1821 N.S. during the Greek War of Independence when Greek revolutionaries defeated the forces of the Ottoman Empire at Doliana (today called Ano Doliana to distinguish from nearby Kato Doliana) in the Morea province of the Ottoman Empire.

Battle
After the Turkish defeat at the battle of Valtetsi, the Turkish leader Kâhya Mustafa Bey decided to attack and destroy the Greek camp of Vervena where 2,500 armed Greeks had gathered. According to Spyridon Trikoupis, it was believed by the Turks that the destruction of Vervena would seriously damage Greek morale.

During the night of 17–18 May, an Ottoman force of six thousand men and two cannons marched from Tripoli to Vervena. The Turkish plan would only succeed if the Ottoman army could pass Doliana where Nikitaras, a leader of the Greek revolutionaries, was positioned with approximately two hundred men. By the time the Ottomans reached Doliana, Nikitaras had established a fortified position utilizing ordinary houses. When the Turks arrived they were surprised by the Greeks and panicked. Meanwhile at Vervena, when a portion of the Ottoman army arrived it was forced to quickly retreat because the Greek revolutionaries had realized the impending danger and prepared for an attack by taking positions to flank the Turks. Due to the number of casualties, Mustafa Bey and the Turks retreated. The Greeks followed the Turks as they withdrew and continued to pursue their fleeing enemy to Tripoli. 

According to the Greek General Kolokotronis, the Ottomans lost seventy men and abandoned their cannons and materials on the battlefield. Nikitaras, who had up to that point lived in the shadow of General Kolokotronis, earned a reputation and nickname for himself. A legend of the time reported that after the battle of Doliana, Nikitaras' sword got stuck to his hand and could not be removed.

Significance
The victorious Battle of Doliana was a big morale boost for the Greek revolutionaries. It marked the last time that the besieged Ottoman army left Tripoli and opened the way for the fall of the city and the firm establishment of the independence movement in the Peloponnese.

See also
 
 Ano Doliana

Citations

References

  
  

Doliana
Doliana
Doliana
Doliana
1821 in Greece
History of Arcadia, Peloponnese
May 1821 events
Peloponnese in the Greek War of Independence